Tekapo Ridge is a crescent-shaped chain of low peaks, 3 nautical miles (6 km) long, in Kyle Hills, Ross Island. The ridge descends SW-NE from Scanniello Peak (c.2200 m) to Parawera Cone (c.1300 m). Named by the New Zealand Geographic Board (NZGB) (2000) after Tekapo, a New Zealand locality where Antarctic training takes place.

Ridges of Ross Island